Paul McCallum may refer to:

Paul McCallum (gridiron football) (born 1970), Canadian football player
Paul McCallum (footballer) (born 1993), English footballer